Rachel Chaleski is an American politician who serves in the Connecticut House of Representatives representing the 138th district. The district is composed of the northwest section of Danbury. She is serving her first term and was elected in November 2022.

References

Republican Party members of the Connecticut House of Representatives
Year of birth missing (living people)
Living people
Women state legislators in Connecticut
Politicians from Danbury, Connecticut